Protestants in Taiwan constitute a religious minority of about 2.6% of the population of total population or 595,254 people in number (see Protestantism by country). Protestantism was introduced to Taiwan during the Dutch colonial period.

See also
Christianity in Taiwan
Presbyterian Church in Taiwan

 
History of the Dutch East India Company